The Bougainville mosaic-tailed rat (Melomys bougainville) is a species of rodent in the family Muridae.

It is found only in Papua New Guinea.

References

Melomys
Rats of Asia
Rodents of Papua New Guinea
Mammals described in 1936
Taxonomy articles created by Polbot
Taxa named by Ellis Le Geyt Troughton